Dongshan Shouchu (died  900) was a Chinese Zen teacher and an heir to Yunmen Wenyan. Dongshan is the subject of Case 18 "Three Pounds of Flax" in The Gateless Barrier, a collection of koans authored by the Chan master Wumen Huikai in 1228.

References 

900 deaths
Tang dynasty Buddhist monks
Zen Buddhist spiritual teachers
Chinese Zen Buddhists
Year of birth unknown